ET or et may refer to:

Arts and entertainment and media

E.T. the Extra-Terrestrial franchise
E.T. the Extra-Terrestrial, a 1982 film
E.T. the Extra-Terrestrial (video game), a 1982 video game
E.T. the Extra-Terrestrial (soundtrack), a soundtrack score album by John Williams
E.T. the Extra-Terrestrial (album), an audiobook album by Michael Jackson and the original cast

Music
Electro Team, a eurodance band from Croatia
"E.T." (song), a 2011 song by Katy Perry from Teenage Dream
"ET (Extra-Terrestrial)", a song by OutKast from ATLiens
"E.T. Phone Home", a song by Jupiter 8 Featuring Kitty Woodson, co-authored by George Terry

Film 

 Etharkkum Thunindhavan, a 2022 film

Other
Entertainment Tonight, an American television entertainment news show
Eastern Television, a Taiwanese television network
The Epoch Times, a newspaper
Economic Times (disambiguation), several newspapers
Evangelical Times, a British Christian newspaper

Science and technology

Biology and medicine
ET tube, or endotracheal tube
Essential thrombocythemia, a chronic blood cancer
Essential tremor, a neurological disorder characterized by shaking of hands and limbs
Evapotranspiration, a sum of evaporation and plant transpiration

Chemistry
Electron transfer, the move of an electron from one atom or molecule to another
Ethyl group, a functional group in organic chemistry

Other uses in science and technology
Electromagnetic testing
Electron tomography
Envelope tracking, a technique to provide a dynamic power supply to RF power amplifier
Space Shuttle external tank
Köppen climate classification for tundra
Extraterrestrial life

People
Electronics Technician, a rating in the United States Navy
Andrew Ettingshausen, rugby league footballer
E Thi, Burmese fortune teller

Eric Thomas (motivational speaker)
Errol Thompson (audio engineer), dub producer

Places
Eastern Time Zone
Ethiopia's ISO 3166-1 country code
.et, the country code top-level domain (ccTLD) for Ethiopia

Other uses
Ampersand punctuation mark (&), originally derived from Latin et
Et (letter), a letter in the Armenian alphabet
Energy Transfer Partners, American pipeline company (NYSE stock symbol ET)
Estonian language's ISO 639 code
Ethiopian Airlines' IATA airline designator

See also

 Extraterrestrial (disambiguation)